Phase III is the third studio album by the American singing group The Osmonds, released in 1972. The album reached number ten on the Billboard Top LPs chart on March 11, 1972.  Two singles released from the album, "Yo-Yo" and "Down by the Lazy River", reached No. 3 and No. 4 on the Billboard Hot 100 singles chart, respectively.  The album was certified Gold by the RIAA on May 29, 1972.

Phase III was, as its name implied, a shift in direction for the band, after its 1960s era as variety-show child stars and the band's early breakthrough as bubblegum pop idols, much of this album featured the band moving into a hard rock sound and writing more of their own material.

Track listing

Personnel
Producer: Alan Osmond, Michael Lloyd (Tracks 1-3, 7-8, 10)
Producer: Rick Hall (Track 4-5)
Producer: Alan Osmond, Mike Curb, Ray Ruff (Track 6)
Producer: Alan Osmond, Don Costa, Mike Curb (Track 9)

Charts

Album

Singles

Certifications

References

1972 albums
The Osmonds albums
Albums produced by Mike Curb
Albums produced by Don Costa
MGM Records albums